This is a list of 742 species in Mycetophila, a genus of fungus gnats in the family Mycetophilidae.

Mycetophila species

 Mycetophila abbreviata Landrock, 1914 c g
 Mycetophila abdominale (Staeger, 1840) c g
 Mycetophila abiecta (Lastovka, 1963) c g
 Mycetophila absqua Wu, He & Yang, 1998 c g
 Mycetophila acarensis Lane, 1952 c g
 Mycetophila acarisi Lane, 1958 c g
 Mycetophila adumbrata Mik, 1884 c g
 Mycetophila aequalis Walker, 1856 c g
 Mycetophila aequilonga Wu, He & Yang, 1998 c g
 Mycetophila aguilaensis Duret, 1983 c g
 Mycetophila alacalufesi Duret, 1980 c g
 Mycetophila alata Guthrie, 1917 i c g
 Mycetophila alberta Curran, 1927 i c g
 Mycetophila alea Laffoon, 1965 i c g
 Mycetophila alexanderi (Laffoon, 1957) i c g
 Mycetophila aliciae Duret, 1981 c g
 Mycetophila altensis Duret, 1980 c g
 Mycetophila amoena (Winnertz, 1863) c g
 Mycetophila amplicercis Duret, 1989 c g
 Mycetophila amplipennis Freeman, 1951 c g
 Mycetophila amplocercis Duret, 1991 c g
 Mycetophila analis (Coquillett, 1901) i c g
 Mycetophila ancyloformans (Holmgren, 1907) c g
 Mycetophila andina Duret, 1983 c g
 Mycetophila andinensis Duret, 1991 c g
 Mycetophila angularisa Wu, 1997 c g
 Mycetophila angustifurca Enderlein, 1938 c g
 Mycetophila anhangaensis Lane, 1961 c g
 Mycetophila anivensis Zaitzev, 1999 c g
 Mycetophila annulara Wu, He & Yang, 1998 c g
 Mycetophila apicalis Freeman, 1951 c g
 Mycetophila apicata Philippi, 1865 c g
 Mycetophila aracanensis Duret, 1985 c g
 Mycetophila arancanensis Duret, 1985 c g
 Mycetophila arauasi Lane, 1958 c g
 Mycetophila araucana Lane, 1962 c g
 Mycetophila arcuata Meigen, 1818 c g
 Mycetophila arecunai Lane, 1955 c g
 Mycetophila argentina Lane, 1958 c g
 Mycetophila argentinensis Duret, 1986 c g
 Mycetophila armatura Freeman, 1951 c g
 Mycetophila arnaudi (Lafoon, 1957) i c g
 Mycetophila arribalzagai Duret, 1981 c g
 Mycetophila artigasi Duret, 1980 c g
 Mycetophila artyomi Zaitzev, 1998 c g
 Mycetophila asiatica (Okada, 1939) c g
 Mycetophila assimilis Matile, 1967 c g
 Mycetophila atlantica Nielsen, 1966 g
 Mycetophila atra (Macquart, 1834) c g
 Mycetophila atricornis Philippi, 1865 c g
 Mycetophila attenuata Wiedemann, 1818 c g
 Mycetophila attonsa (Laffoon, 1957) i c g
 Mycetophila autumnalis Lundstrom, 1909 c g
 Mycetophila avicularia Freeman, 1951 c g
 Mycetophila axeli Duret, 1985 c g
 Mycetophila bachmanni Duret, 1980 c g
 Mycetophila banhumai Lane, 1952 c g
 Mycetophila barrettoi Lane, 1947 c g
 Mycetophila bartaki Sevcik, 2004 c g
 Mycetophila basalis Freeman, 1951 c g
 Mycetophila bejaranoi Duret, 1981 c g
 Mycetophila bentincki (Laffoon, 1957) i g
 Mycetophila bertae Duret, 1979 c g
 Mycetophila bialorussica Dziedzicki, 1884 c g
 Mycetophila bifida Freeman, 1954 c g
 Mycetophila bifila Freeman, 1951 c g
 Mycetophila biflagellata Duret, 1991 c g
 Mycetophila biformata Duret, 1986 c g
 Mycetophila biformis Duret, 1992 c g
 Mycetophila binotata Walker, 1856 c g
 Mycetophila bipunctata Loew, 1869 i c g
 Mycetophila bisetosa Freeman, 1951 c g
 Mycetophila biusta Wiedemann, 1818 c g
 Mycetophila bivittata (Strobl, 1880) c g
 Mycetophila blagoderovi Zaitzev, 1998 c g
 Mycetophila blanchardi Enderlein, 1910 c g
 Mycetophila blanda Winnertz, 1863 c g
 Mycetophila bohartorum (Laffoon, 1957) i c g
 Mycetophila bohemica (Lastovka, 1963) c g
 Mycetophila bolbachiensis Duret, 1987 c g
 Mycetophila boracensis Lane, 1948 c g
 Mycetophila boreocruciator Sevcik, 2003 c g
 Mycetophila borgmeieri Edwards, 1932 c g
 Mycetophila borneana Edwards, 1933 c g
 Mycetophila brachypoda Ostroverkhova, 1979 c g
 Mycetophila brachyptera Duret, 1989 c g
 Mycetophila brasiliensis (Enderlein, 1910) c g
 Mycetophila brethesi Duret, 1981 c g
 Mycetophila brevicornis (Meigen, 1838) c g
 Mycetophila brevifurcata Freeman, 1951 c g
 Mycetophila brevitarsata (Lastovka, 1963) c g
 Mycetophila breyeri Duret, 1981 c g
 Mycetophila bridgesi Lane, 1963 c g
 Mycetophila britannica Lastovka & Kidd, 1975 c g
 Mycetophila browningi (Laffoon, 1957) i c g
 Mycetophila bruchi Duret, 1981 c g
 Mycetophila brunnescens Freeman, 1951 c g
 Mycetophila byersi (Laffoon, 1957) i c g
 Mycetophila calvuscuta Wu, He & Yang, 1998 c g
 Mycetophila campbellensis Harrison, 1964 c g
 Mycetophila canicula Freeman, 1951 c g
 Mycetophila capreolata (Laffoon, 1957) i c g
 Mycetophila caprii Duret, 1981 c g
 Mycetophila caribai Lane, 1955 c g
 Mycetophila caripunai Lane, 1955 c g
 Mycetophila carpinteroi Duret, 1980 c g
 Mycetophila carrerai Lane, 1958 c g
 Mycetophila carruthi Shaw, 1951 i c g
 Mycetophila catharinae Edwards, 1932 c g
 Mycetophila caudata Staeger, 1840 i c g
 Mycetophila caudatusaceus Wu, He & Yang, 1998 c g
 Mycetophila caurina (Laffoon, 1957) i c g
 Mycetophila cavalierii Duret, 1981 c g
 Mycetophila cavillator (Laffoon, 1957) i c g
 Mycetophila cayuensis Lane, 1955 c g
 Mycetophila cekalovici Duret, 1980 c g
 Mycetophila celator (Laffoon, 1957) i c g
 Mycetophila chamberlini (Laffoon, 1957) i c g
 Mycetophila chandleri Wu, 1997 c g
 Mycetophila chaoi Wu & He, 1997 c g
 Mycetophila chilena Duret, 1979 c g
 Mycetophila chilenensis Duret, 1985 c g
 Mycetophila chillanensis Duret, 1981 c g
 Mycetophila chiloensis Duret, 1981 c g
 Mycetophila chinguensis Duret, 1985 c g
 Mycetophila chlorochroa Freeman, 1951 c g
 Mycetophila chubutensis Duret, 1991 c g
 Mycetophila cingulum Meigen, 1830 i c g
 Mycetophila clara Tonnoir & Edwards, 1927 c g
 Mycetophila clarovittata Freeman, 1951 c g
 Mycetophila clavata Van Duzee, 1928 i g
 Mycetophila clavigera Freeman, 1951 c g
 Mycetophila clydeae Duret, 1986 c g
 Mycetophila clypeata Wu, He & Yang, 1998 c g
 Mycetophila coenosa Wu, 1997 c g
 Mycetophila cognata Philippi, 1865 c g
 Mycetophila collineola (Speiser, 1909) c g
 Mycetophila colorata Tonnoir & Edwards, 1927 c g
 Mycetophila comata (Laffoon, 1957) i c g
 Mycetophila concinna (Laffoon, 1957) i c g
 Mycetophila confluens Dziedzicki, 1884 c g
 Mycetophila confusa Dziedzicki, 1884 c g
 Mycetophila conica Tonnoir & Edwards, 1927 c g
 Mycetophila conifera Freeman, 1951 c g
 Mycetophila conjuncta Freeman, 1951 c g
 Mycetophila consobrina Tonnoir & Edwards, 1927 c g
 Mycetophila consonans (Laffoon, 1957) i c g
 Mycetophila constricta Freeman, 1951 c g
 Mycetophila contigua Walker, 1848 i c g
 Mycetophila continens Becker, 1908 c g
 Mycetophila cordillerana Duret, 1985 c g
 Mycetophila cornuta Freeman, 1951 c g
 Mycetophila corsica Edwards, 1928 c g
 Mycetophila coscaroni Duret, 1980 c g
 Mycetophila costaricensis Lane, 1958 c g
 Mycetophila coxiponesi Lane, 1958 c g
 Mycetophila crassicornis (Roser, 1840) c g
 Mycetophila crassiseta (Laffoon, 1957) i c g
 Mycetophila crassitarsis Tonnoir & Edwards, 1927 c g
 Mycetophila cruciator (Laffoon, 1957) i c g
 Mycetophila curiaensis Lane, 1952 c g
 Mycetophila curtisi Tonnoir & Edwards, 1927 c g
 Mycetophila curvicaudata Wu, 1997 c g
 Mycetophila curvilinea Brunetti, 1912 c g
 Mycetophila curviseta Lundstrom, 1911 c g
 Mycetophila czizeki Landrock, 1911 c g
 Mycetophila dalcahuensis Duret, 1991 c g
 Mycetophila decarloi Duret, 1983 c g
 Mycetophila deceitensis Duret, 1991 c g
 Mycetophila deflexa Chandler, 2001 c g
 Mycetophila delgadoi Duret, 1981 c g
 Mycetophila demacuri Lane, 1955 c g
 Mycetophila dentata Lundstrom, 1913 i c g
 Mycetophila desantisi Duret, 1981 c g
 Mycetophila devia (Laffoon, 1957) i g
 Mycetophila devioides Bechev, 1988 c g
 Mycetophila dichaeta Freeman, 1951 c g
 Mycetophila difficilis (Bukowski, 1934) c g
 Mycetophila diffusa Tonnoir & Edwards, 1927 c g
 Mycetophila digna Plassmann & Vogel, 1990 c g
 Mycetophila digtalis Freeman, 1951 c g
 Mycetophila dilatata Tonnoir & Edwards, 1927 c g
 Mycetophila diligens Zaitzev, 1999 c g
 Mycetophila discors (Laffoon, 1957) i c g
 Mycetophila disparata Plassmann & Schacht, 1990 c g
 Mycetophila distigma Meigen, 1830 c g
 Mycetophila distincta Freeman, 1951 c g
 Mycetophila dististylata (Sasakawa, 1964) c g
 Mycetophila dolichocenta Wu & He, 1997 c g
 Mycetophila dollyae Duret, 1979 c g
 Mycetophila dollylanfrancoae Duret, 1983 c g
 Mycetophila dolosa Williston, 1896 c g
 Mycetophila dominica Curran, 1927 c g
 Mycetophila drepana Wu, He & Yang, 1998 c g
 Mycetophila duodevia Plassmann & Schacht, 2002 c g
 Mycetophila dziedzickii Chandler, 1977 c g
 Mycetophila edura Johannsen, 1912 i c g
 Mycetophila edwardsi Lundstrom, 1913 c g
 Mycetophila elegans Tonnoir & Edwards, 1927 g
 Mycetophila elongata Tonnoir & Edwards, 1927 c g
 Mycetophila enthea Zaitzev, 1998 c g
 Mycetophila eppingensis Chandler, 2001 c g
 Mycetophila eramanensis Lane, 1955 c g
 Mycetophila erecta Duret, 1992 c g
 Mycetophila estonica Kurina, 1992 c g
 Mycetophila evanida Lastovka, 1972 c g
 Mycetophila exstincta Loew, 1869 i c g
 Mycetophila faceta (Laffoon, 1957) i c g
 Mycetophila fagi Marshall, 1896 c g
 Mycetophila fagnanoensis Duret, 1991 c g
 Mycetophila falcata Johannsen, 1912 i g
 Mycetophila fasciata Meigen, 1804 g
 Mycetophila fascinator (Laffoon, 1957) i c g
 Mycetophila fascipennis Philippi, 1865 c g
 Mycetophila fatua Johannsen, 1912 i c g
 Mycetophila favonica Chandler, 1993 c g
 Mycetophila fenestratula Becker, 1908 c g
 Mycetophila fereina Plassmann & Schacht, 2002 c g
 Mycetophila fernandezi Duret, 1981 c g
 Mycetophila ferrazi Lane, 1955 c g
 Mycetophila ferruginea (Walker, 1836) c g
 Mycetophila filiae Zaitzev, 1998 c g
 Mycetophila filicronis Tonnoir & Edwards, 1927 c g
 Mycetophila finlandica Edwards, 1913 i c g
 Mycetophila fisherae (Laffoon, 1957) i c g b
 Mycetophila flabellifera Freeman, 1951 c g
 Mycetophila flava Winnertz, 1863 g
 Mycetophila flavipes (Macquart, 1826) c g
 Mycetophila flavithorax Freeman, 1951 c g
 Mycetophila flavoconjuncta Duret, 1987 c g
 Mycetophila flavolineata (Bukowski, 1934) c g
 Mycetophila flavolunata Freeman, 1951 c g
 Mycetophila flexiseta Freeman, 1951 c g
 Mycetophila fluctata Becker, 1908 c g
 Mycetophila foecunda Johannsen, 1912 i c g
 Mycetophila forattinii Lane, 1955 c g
 Mycetophila forcipata Lundstrom, 1913 c g
 Mycetophila formosa Lundstrom, 1911 c g
 Mycetophila fortisa Wu, 1997 c g
 Mycetophila franzi Plassmann, 1977 c g
 Mycetophila fraterna Winnertz, 1863 c g
 Mycetophila freemani Lane, 1948 c g
 Mycetophila freyi Lundstrom, 1909 c g
 Mycetophila fritzi Duret, 1980 c g
 Mycetophila frustrator (Laffoon, 1957) i c g
 Mycetophila fueguina Duret, 1980 c g
 Mycetophila fulva (Winnertz, 1863) c g
 Mycetophila fulvicollis (Stannius, 1831) c g
 Mycetophila fulvithorax (Strobl, 1910) c g
 Mycetophila fumosa Tonnoir & Edwards, 1927 c g
 Mycetophila funerea Freeman, 1951 c g
 Mycetophila fungorum (De Geer, 1776) i c g
 Mycetophila furtiva Tonnoir & Edwards, 1927 c g
 Mycetophila furvusa Wu, 1997 c g
 Mycetophila fusconitens Becker, 1908 c g
 Mycetophila galibisi Lane, 1955 c g
 Mycetophila garciai Duret, 1981 c g
 Mycetophila garridoi Duret, 1980 c g
 Mycetophila gentilicia Zaitzev, 1999 c g
 Mycetophila gentilii Duret, 1980 c g
 Mycetophila genuflexuosa Wu, He & Yang, 1998 c g
 Mycetophila ghanii Shaw, 1951 i c g
 Mycetophila gibbula Edwards, 1925 c g
 Mycetophila glabra Wu, He & Yang, 1998 c g
 Mycetophila golbachi Lane, 1958 c g
 Mycetophila golbachiani Duret, 1987 c g
 Mycetophila gradata Freeman, 1951 c g
 Mycetophila grandis Tonnoir & Edwards, 1927 c g
 Mycetophila grata Wu, He & Yang, 1998 c g
 Mycetophila gratiosa Winnertz, 1863 c g
 Mycetophila griseofusca Tonnoir & Edwards, 1927 c g
 Mycetophila grisescens Tonnoir & Edwards, 1927 c g
 Mycetophila guanasi Lane, 1958 c g
 Mycetophila guaraiasi Lane, 1952 c g
 Mycetophila guatensis Lane, 1955 c g
 Mycetophila hamata Winnertz, 1863 c g
 Mycetophila harrisi Tonnoir & Edwards, 1927 c g
 Mycetophila haruspica Plassmann, 1990 c g
 Mycetophila hepperi Duret, 1981 c g
 Mycetophila hermani Duret, 1985 c g
 Mycetophila heterochaeta Ostroverkhova, 1979 c g
 Mycetophila heteroneura Philippi, 1865 c g
 Mycetophila hetschkoi Landrock, 1918 c g
 Mycetophila hilaris (Dufour, 1839) c g
 Mycetophila hilversidae Zaitzev, 1998 c g
 Mycetophila hiulca (Laffoon, 1957) i c g
 Mycetophila hormosensis Duret, 1991 c g
 Mycetophila horrida Ostroverkhova, 1979 c g
 Mycetophila howletti Marshall, 1896 c g
 Mycetophila humboldti Lane, 1948 c g
 Mycetophila hutsoni Duret, 1981 c g
 Mycetophila hyrcania Lastovka & Matile, 1969 c g
 Mycetophila ibarragrassoi Duret, 1986 c g
 Mycetophila ibarrai Duret, 1981 c g
 Mycetophila ichneumonea Say, 1823 i c g
 Mycetophila icosi Lane, 1958 c g
 Mycetophila idonea Lastovka, 1972 c g
 Mycetophila iheringi Lane, 1948 c g
 Mycetophila illita Freeman, 1951 c g
 Mycetophila illudens (Laffoon, 1957) i c g
 Mycetophila immaculata Dziedzicki, 1884 c g
 Mycetophila impeccabilis Zaitzev, 1999 c g
 Mycetophila impellans (Johannsen, 1912) i c g
 Mycetophila impunctata Tonnoir & Edwards, 1927 c g
 Mycetophila incompleta (Macquart, 1826) c g
 Mycetophila indecisa Duret, 1985 c g
 Mycetophila indiana Duret, 1986 c g
 Mycetophila indigena Duret, 1986 c g
 Mycetophila inermis Dufour, 1839 c g
 Mycetophila inquisita Zaitzev, 1999 c g
 Mycetophila insecta Freeman, 1951 c g
 Mycetophila insipiens (Williston, 1896) c g
 Mycetophila integra Tonnoir & Edwards, 1927 c g
 Mycetophila intermedia Tonnoir & Edwards, 1927 c g
 Mycetophila interrita Plassmann & Vogel, 1990 c g
 Mycetophila interrupta Becker, 1908 c g
 Mycetophila intortusa Wu, He & Yang, 1998 c g
 Mycetophila irregularis Kallweit, 1995 c g
 Mycetophila isabelae Duret, 1981 c g
 Mycetophila ishiharai Sasakawa, 1994 c g
 Mycetophila itascae (Laffoon, 1957) i c g
 Mycetophila javaesi Lane, 1955 c g
 Mycetophila josepastranai Duret, 1991 c g
 Mycetophila jucunda Johannsen, 1912 i c g
 Mycetophila jugata Johannsen, 1912 i c g
 Mycetophila juinensis Lane, 1952 c g
 Mycetophila juri Lane, 1955 c g
 Mycetophila jurunensis Lane, 1955 c g
 Mycetophila kaingangi Lane, 1956 c g
 Mycetophila karpathica Landrock, 1925 c g
 Mycetophila karthalae Matile, 1979 c g
 Mycetophila kunasensis Lane, 1955 c g
 Mycetophila lacuna Freeman, 1951 c g
 Mycetophila laeta Walker, 1848 i c g
 Mycetophila laffooni Lastkova, 1972 i c g
 Mycetophila laianasi Lane, 1958 c g
 Mycetophila lamellata Lundstrom, 1911 c g
 Mycetophila lanfrancoae Duret, 1977 c g
 Mycetophila laninae Duret, 1992 c g
 Mycetophila laninensis Duret, 1981 c g
 Mycetophila lapponica Lundstrom, 1906 c g
 Mycetophila lastovkai Caspers, 1984 c g
 Mycetophila lateralis Meigen, 1818 c g
 Mycetophila latichaeta Wu, He & Yang, 1998 c g
 Mycetophila latifascia Tonnoir & Edwards, 1927 c g
 Mycetophila lativitta Freeman, 1951 c g
 Mycetophila lenis Johannsen, 1912 i c g
 Mycetophila lenta Johannsen, 1912 i c g
 Mycetophila leonyivoffi Duret, 1991 c g
 Mycetophila limata (Laffoon, 1957) i c g
 Mycetophila limbata Lundstrom, 1911 c g
 Mycetophila lineicoxa Edwards, 1928 c g
 Mycetophila lineola Meigen, 1818 c g
 Mycetophila lobulata Zaitzev, 1999 c g
 Mycetophila lomodensis Tonnoir & Edwards, 1927 c g
 Mycetophila longiseta Ostroverkhova, 1979 c g
 Mycetophila longwangshana Wu, He & Yang, 1998 c g
 Mycetophila lonquimayensis Duret, 1991 c g
 Mycetophila lubomirskii Dziedzicki, 1884 c g
 Mycetophila lucidithorax (Bukowski, 1934) c g
 Mycetophila luctuosa Meigen, 1830 i c g
 Mycetophila luederwaldti (Enderlein, 1910) c g
 Mycetophila luispenai Duret, 1980 c g
 Mycetophila lunata Meigen, 1804 c g
 Mycetophila lurida Meigen, 1818 c g
 Mycetophila luteolateralis Tonnoir & Edwards, 1927 c g
 Mycetophila macrocephala Duret, 1986 c g
 Mycetophila maculata (Macquart, 1834) g
 Mycetophila madocella Chandler & Ribeiro, 1995 c g
 Mycetophila magallanensis Duret, 1986 c g
 Mycetophila magallanica Duret, 1977 c g
 Mycetophila magnicauda Strobl, 1895 c g
 Mycetophila mallecoana Duret, 1991 c g
 Mycetophila mallecoensis Duret, 1981 c g
 Mycetophila mapuchesi Duret, 1986 c g
 Mycetophila margaritae Duret, 1981 c g
 Mycetophila marginata Winnertz, 1863 c g
 Mycetophila marginepunctata Tonnoir & Edwards, 1927 c g
 Mycetophila marginisetosa Sasakawa, 2005 c g
 Mycetophila mariluisi Duret, 1981 c g
 Mycetophila marshalli Enderlein, 1910 c g
 Mycetophila martinezi Duret, 1980 c g
 Mycetophila martinici Duret, 1979 c g
 Mycetophila mathesoni Lane, 1948 c g
 Mycetophila matsumurai Lastovka, 1972 c g
 Mycetophila maurii Duret, 1981 c g
 Mycetophila media Tonnoir & Edwards, 1927 c g
 Mycetophila merdigera Knab & Zwaluwenburg, 1918 c g
 Mycetophila meridionalisa Wu, 1997 c g
 Mycetophila mesorphina Speiser, 1911 c g
 Mycetophila mikii Dziedzicki, 1884 c g
 Mycetophila minima Tonnoir & Edwards, 1927 c g
 Mycetophila minuta Ostroverkhova, 1979 c g
 Mycetophila mitis (Johannsen, 1912) i c g
 Mycetophila mohilevensis Dziedzicki, 1884 g
 Mycetophila mohilivensis Dziedzicki, 1884 c g
 Mycetophila monostigma Wiedemann, 1818 c g
 Mycetophila monstera Maximova, 2002 c g
 Mycetophila montana Landrock, 1925 c g
 Mycetophila montealtensis Duret, 1979 c g
 Mycetophila morata Zaitzev, 1999 c g
 Mycetophila moravica Landrock, 1925 i c g
 Mycetophila morosa Winnertz, 1863 c g
 Mycetophila multiplex Freeman, 1951 c g
 Mycetophila nahuelbutaensis Duret, 1983 c g
 Mycetophila nahuelhuapi Duret, 1985 c g
 Mycetophila nana (Macquart, 1826) c g
 Mycetophila napaea (Laffoon, 1957) i c g
 Mycetophila naratakevora (Okada, 1939) c g
 Mycetophila naumanni Duret, 1992 c g
 Mycetophila nebulosa (Stannius, 1831) c g
 Mycetophila nemorivaga Zaitzev, 1998 c g
 Mycetophila neoclavigera Duret, 1986 c g
 Mycetophila neoconifera Duret, 1985 c g
 Mycetophila neoconjuncta Duret, 1987 c g
 Mycetophila neoconstricta Duret, 1992 c g
 Mycetophila neoflavithorax Duret, 1992 c g
 Mycetophila neofunerea Duret, 1992 c g
 Mycetophila neofungorum Chandler, 1993 c g
 Mycetophila neolorigera Duret, 1991 c g
 Mycetophila neomacrocephala Duret, 1991 c g
 Mycetophila neomapuchesi Duret, 1986 c g
 Mycetophila neoparapicalis Duret, 1986 c g
 Mycetophila neopucatrihuana Duret, 1992 c g
 Mycetophila neotriangulifera Duret, 1991 c g
 Mycetophila nervitacta Freeman, 1951 c g
 Mycetophila neuquina Duret, 1981 c g
 Mycetophila neuquinensis Duret, 1985 c g
 Mycetophila nigrescens Freeman, 1951 c g
 Mycetophila nigricans Tonnoir & Edwards, 1927 c g
 Mycetophila nigricincta (Stannius, 1831) c g
 Mycetophila nigripalpis Tonnoir & Edwards, 1927 c g
 Mycetophila nigriventris Philippi, 1865 g
 Mycetophila nigrofusca Dziedzicki, 1884 c g
 Mycetophila nigromadera Chandler & Ribeiro, 1995 c g
 Mycetophila nitens Tonnoir & Edwards, 1927 c g
 Mycetophila nitidula Tonnoir & Edwards, 1927 c g
 Mycetophila nodulosa Williston, 1896 c g
 Mycetophila notata Freeman, 1951 c g
 Mycetophila nubila (Say, 1829) c g
 Mycetophila nublensis Lane, 1962 c g
 Mycetophila obscura (Walker, 1848) c g
 Mycetophila obscuripennis Blanchard, 1852 c g
 Mycetophila obsoleta (Zetterstedt, 1852) c g
 Mycetophila ocellus Walker, 1848 i c g
 Mycetophila ocultans Lundstrom, 1913 c g
 Mycetophila oligodona Wu, He & Yang, 1998 c g
 Mycetophila oligoneura (Stannius, 1831) c g
 Mycetophila olivae Duret, 1983 c g
 Mycetophila onasi Duret, 1980 c g
 Mycetophila oratorila Wu & Yang, 1997 c g
 Mycetophila ordinseta Freeman, 1951 c g
 Mycetophila ornata Stephens, 1829 c g
 Mycetophila ornatidorsum (Enderlein, 1910) c g
 Mycetophila ornatipennis Blanchard, 1852 c g
 Mycetophila ornatissima Tonnoir & Edwards, 1927 c g
 Mycetophila osornoana Duret, 1991 c g
 Mycetophila osornoensis Duret, 1981 c g
 Mycetophila ostensackenii Dziedzicki, 1884 c g
 Mycetophila ostentanea Zaitzev, 1998 c g
 Mycetophila palaciosi Duret, 1981 c g
 Mycetophila pallida (Bukowski, 1934) g
 Mycetophila pallidicornis (Macquart, 1826) c g
 Mycetophila pallipes (Meigen, 1838) c g
 Mycetophila paracapitata Duret, 1991 c g
 Mycetophila paraconifera Duret, 1985 c g
 Mycetophila paraconjuncta Duret, 1987 c g
 Mycetophila paraconstricta Duret, 1981 c g
 Mycetophila paracruciator Lastovka & Matile, 1974 c g
 Mycetophila paradisa Wu, He & Yang, 1998 c g
 Mycetophila parafunerea Duret, 1992 c g
 Mycetophila paralativitta Duret, 1991 c g
 Mycetophila paranervitacta Duret, 1987 c g
 Mycetophila paranotata Freeman, 1954 c g
 Mycetophila paraonasi Duret, 1980 c g
 Mycetophila paraordiniseta Duret, 1979 c g
 Mycetophila parapellucida Duret, 1981 c g
 Mycetophila parapicalis Freeman, 1954 c g
 Mycetophila parapucatrihuana Duret, 1992 c g
 Mycetophila parasubfusca Duret, 1981 c g
 Mycetophila parata Zaitzev, 1998 c g
 Mycetophila paratehuechesi Duret, 1991 c g
 Mycetophila paraunicornuta Duret, 1991 c g
 Mycetophila parawillineri Duret, 1992 c g
 Mycetophila parva Walker, 1848 i c g
 Mycetophila parvifasciata (Santos Abreu, 1920) c g
 Mycetophila parvimaculata Van Duzee, 1928 i c g
 Mycetophila parvula Ostroverkhova, 1979 c g
 Mycetophila passei Lane, 1952 c g
 Mycetophila pastranai Duret, 1981 c g
 Mycetophila patagoiensis Duret, 1991 c g
 Mycetophila patagonesi Lane, 1958 c g
 Mycetophila patagonica Duret, 1979 c g
 Mycetophila patagoniensis Duret, 1989 c g
 Mycetophila paula (Loew, 1869) i c g
 Mycetophila paxillata (Laffooon, 1957) i c g
 Mycetophila pecinai (Lastovka, 1963) c g
 Mycetophila pectinata Freeman, 1951 c g
 Mycetophila pectita Johannsen, 1912 i c g
 Mycetophila pellucida Freeman, 1951 c g
 Mycetophila penai Duret, 1981 c g
 Mycetophila penicillata Sasakawa, 2005 c g
 Mycetophila peniculata Freeman, 1951 c g
 Mycetophila percursa (Laffoon, 1957) i c g
 Mycetophila perita Johannsen, 1912 i c g
 Mycetophila perpallida Chandler, 1993 c g
 Mycetophila perpauca Lastovka, 1972 c g
 Mycetophila petulca Zaitzev, 1998 c g
 Mycetophila philomycesa Wu, 1997 c g
 Mycetophila phyllura Tonnoir & Edwards, 1927 c g
 Mycetophila picea Freeman, 1951 c g
 Mycetophila picta (Macquart, 1834) g
 Mycetophila pictula Meigen, 1830 i c g
 Mycetophila pinarensis Duret, 1986 c g
 Mycetophila pinguis Loew, 1869 i c g
 Mycetophila piranoi Duret, 1981 c g
 Mycetophila pirapesi Lane, 1958 c g
 Mycetophila placata Plassmann & Vogel, 1990 c g
 Mycetophila plaumanni Lane, 1958 c g
 Mycetophila plotnikovae Zaitzev, 2004 g
 Mycetophila pollicata Edwards, 1927 c g
 Mycetophila poloninensis Sevcik, 2004 c g
 Mycetophila porteri Duret, 1981 c g
 Mycetophila prionoda Wu, He & Yang, 1998 c g
 Mycetophila procera Loew, 1869 i c g
 Mycetophila propinqua Walker, 1848 i c g
 Mycetophila propria Skuse, 1888 c g
 Mycetophila proseni Duret, 1981 c g
 Mycetophila pseudoaltensis Duret, 1980 c g
 Mycetophila pseudoaraucana Duret, 1986 c g
 Mycetophila pseudoclavigera Duret, 1985 c g
 Mycetophila pseudoconifera Duret, 1985 c g
 Mycetophila pseudodigitalis Duret, 1991 c g
 Mycetophila pseudoforcipata Zaitzev, 1998 c g
 Mycetophila pseudofunerea Duret, 1992 c g
 Mycetophila pseudomarshalli Tonnoir & Edwards, 1927 c g
 Mycetophila pseudonervitacta Duret, 1987 c g
 Mycetophila pseudopellucida Duret, 1981 c g
 Mycetophila pseudopenai Duret, 1981 c g
 Mycetophila pseudopicea Duret, 1983 c g
 Mycetophila pseudoquadra (Bukowski, 1934) c g
 Mycetophila pseudoquadroides Matile, 1967 c g
 Mycetophila pseudoviridipes Duret, 1980 c g
 Mycetophila pucara Duret, 1986 c g
 Mycetophila pucaraensis Duret, 1973 c g
 Mycetophila pucarani Duret, 1985 c g
 Mycetophila pucarensis Duret, 1973 c g
 Mycetophila pucatrihuana Duret, 1992 c g
 Mycetophila pucatrihuensis Duret, 1981 c g
 Mycetophila puelchesi Duret, 1986 c g
 Mycetophila pumila Winnertz, 1863 c g
 Mycetophila punctipennis (Stannius, 1831) c g
 Mycetophila punensis Lane, 1955 c g
 Mycetophila puyehuensis Duret, 1991 c g
 Mycetophila pygmaea (Macquart, 1826) c g
 Mycetophila pyrenaica Matile, 1967 c g
 Mycetophila quadra Lundstrom, 1909 c g
 Mycetophila quadrifasciata (Brunetti, 1912) c g
 Mycetophila quadrimaculata (Bukowski, 1934) c g
 Mycetophila ramosa Freeman, 1951 c g
 Mycetophila recta (Johannsen, 1912) i g
 Mycetophila recula (Laffoon, 1957) i c g
 Mycetophila reversa Edwards, 1931 c g
 Mycetophila riparia Chandler, 1993 c g
 Mycetophila ronderosi Duret, 1981 c g
 Mycetophila rosularia Ostroverkhova, 1979 c g
 Mycetophila rubensis Duret, 1981 c g
 Mycetophila rudis Winnertz, 1863 c g
 Mycetophila ruficollis Meigen, 1818 i g
 Mycetophila russata Dziedzicki, 1884 c g
 Mycetophila saltanensis Lane, 1955 c g
 Mycetophila santosiana Stora, 1936 c g
 Mycetophila scalprata Zaitzev, 1998 c g
 Mycetophila schajovskoyi Duret, 1980 c g
 Mycetophila schistocauda Wu, He & Yang, 1998 c g
 Mycetophila schnablii (Dziedzicki, 1884) c g
 Mycetophila scitula (Laffoon, 1957) i c g
 Mycetophila scopata Wu, 2001 g
 Mycetophila scotica Edwards, 1941 i c g
 Mycetophila scourfieldi Duret, 1986 c g
 Mycetophila scutata Wu, He & Yang, 1998 c g
 Mycetophila seclusa (Laffoon, 1957) i c g
 Mycetophila semifusca Meigen, 1818 c g
 Mycetophila senticosa Wu, He & Yang, 1998 c g
 Mycetophila septemtrionalis (Okada, 1939) c g
 Mycetophila sepulta (Laffoon, 1957) i c g
 Mycetophila sequestra Plassmann, 1976 c g
 Mycetophila sergioi Duret, 1973 c g
 Mycetophila sericea (Macquart, 1826) c g
 Mycetophila sertata (Laffoon, 1957) i c g
 Mycetophila setifera Zaitzev, 1999 c g
 Mycetophila shawi (Laffoon, 1957) i c g
 Mycetophila sheni Wu & Yang, 1997 c g
 Mycetophila sibirica (Plotnikova, 1962) c g
 Mycetophila sicyoideusa Wu, He & Yang, 1998 c g
 Mycetophila sierrae (Laffoon, 1957) i c g
 Mycetophila sigillata Dziedzicki, 1884 i c g
 Mycetophila sigmoides Loew, 1869 i c g b
 Mycetophila signata Meigen, 1830 c g
 Mycetophila signatoides Dziedzicki, 1884 i c g
 Mycetophila similis (Santos Abreu, 1920) c g
 Mycetophila simplex Freeman, 1951 c g
 Mycetophila simplicistila Freeman, 1951 c g
 Mycetophila sinuata Freeman, 1951 c g
 Mycetophila sinuosa Plassmann & Schacht, 1999 c g
 Mycetophila solita Freeman, 1951 c g
 Mycetophila solitaris Tonnoir & Edwards, 1927 c g
 Mycetophila sollistima Zaitzev, 1999 c g
 Mycetophila sordens (Wiedemann, 1817) c g
 Mycetophila sordida Wulp, 1874 i c g
 Mycetophila sordida van-der Wulp, 1874 g
 Mycetophila sororia Zaitzev, 1998 c g
 Mycetophila spatiosa Wu, He & Yang, 1998 c g
 Mycetophila spectabilis Winnertz, 1863 c g
 Mycetophila spinigera Tonnoir & Edwards, 1927 c g
 Mycetophila spinilineata Sasakawa, 2005 c g
 Mycetophila spinipes Freeman, 1951 c g
 Mycetophila spinosa Freeman, 1951 c g
 Mycetophila splendida Lane, 1948 c g
 Mycetophila spleniata (Laffoon, 1957) i c g
 Mycetophila stolida Walker, 1856 i c g
 Mycetophila stonei Lane, 1952 c g
 Mycetophila storai Chandler & Ribeiro, 1995 c g
 Mycetophila stricklandi (Laffoon, 1957) i c g
 Mycetophila strigata Staeger, 1840 i c g
 Mycetophila strigatoides (Lundrock, 1927) i c g
 Mycetophila strikeri Duret, 1981 c g
 Mycetophila strobli Lastovka, 1972 c g
 Mycetophila stupposa Wu, He & Yang, 1998 c g
 Mycetophila stylata (Dziedzicki, 1884) c g
 Mycetophila stylatiformis Landrock, 1925 c g
 Mycetophila subbrevitarsata Zaitzev, 1999 c g
 Mycetophila subcapitata Freeman, 1954 c g
 Mycetophila subconstricta Duret, 1981 c g
 Mycetophila subfumosa Freeman, 1954 c g
 Mycetophila subfunerea Duret, 1992 c g
 Mycetophila subfusca Freeman, 1951 c g
 Mycetophila subita (Laffoon, 1957) i c g
 Mycetophila sublaninensis Duret, 1981 c g
 Mycetophila sublunata Zaitzev, 1998 c g
 Mycetophila submarshalli Tonnoir & Edwards, 1927 c g
 Mycetophila subnigrofusca Zaitzev, 1998 c g
 Mycetophila subnitens Tonnoir & Edwards, 1927 c g
 Mycetophila subrecta Freeman, 1954 c g
 Mycetophila subrunnea Freeman, 1951 c g
 Mycetophila subscutellaris (Lindner, 1958) c g
 Mycetophila subsigillata Zaitzev, 1999 c g
 Mycetophila subspinigera Tonnoir & Edwards, 1927 c g
 Mycetophila subtenebrosa Tonnoir & Edwards, 1927 c g
 Mycetophila subtillis Tonnoir & Edwards, 1927 c g
 Mycetophila suburbana Ostroverkhova, 1979 c g
 Mycetophila subvittata Freeman, 1954 c g
 Mycetophila suffusa Brunetti, 1912 c g
 Mycetophila suffusala Chandler & Ribeiro, 1995 c g
 Mycetophila sumavica (Lastovka, 1963) c g
 Mycetophila sylvatica Marshall, 1896 g
 Mycetophila tacuensis Lane, 1952 c g
 Mycetophila talaris Freeman, 1951 c g
 Mycetophila tantula Plassmann & Vogel, 1990 c g
 Mycetophila tapinirai Lane, 1955 c g
 Mycetophila taplejungensis Kallweit, 1995 c g
 Mycetophila tapleyi Tonnoir & Edwards, 1927 c g
 Mycetophila tapuiai Lane, 1958 c g
 Mycetophila tehuelchesi Duret, 1979 c g
 Mycetophila telei Zaitzev, 1999 c g
 Mycetophila temucoensis Duret, 1986 c g
 Mycetophila tenebrosa Tonnoir & Edwards, 1927 c g
 Mycetophila theresae Edwards, 1932 c g
 Mycetophila thioptera Shaw, 1940 i c g
 Mycetophila tiefii Strobl, 1901 c g
 Mycetophila tobasi Lane, 1958 c g
 Mycetophila tolhuacaensis Duret, 1983 c g
 Mycetophila tomensis Plotnikova, 1962 g
 Mycetophila tonnoiri Matile, 1989 c g
 Mycetophila trancasensis Duret, 1992 c g
 Mycetophila triaculeata Ostroverkhova, 1977 c g
 Mycetophila triangularis Lundstrom, 1912 c g
 Mycetophila triangulata Dziedzicki, 1884 c g
 Mycetophila triangulifera Freeman, 1951 c g
 Mycetophila triappendiculata Duret, 1985 c g
 Mycetophila tridentata Lundstrom, 1911 c g
 Mycetophila trimacula Edwards, 1928 c g
 Mycetophila trinotata Staeger, 1840 i c g
 Mycetophila triordinata Freeman, 1954 c g
 Mycetophila triseriata (Bukowski, 1949) c g
 Mycetophila trispinosa Tonnoir & Edwards, 1927 c g
 Mycetophila trivittata Freeman, 1951 c g
 Mycetophila tuberosa Lundstrom, 1911 c g
 Mycetophila tucumana Lane, 1958 c g
 Mycetophila tucunensis (Lane, 1955) c g
 Mycetophila tungusica Ostroverkhova, 1979 c g
 Mycetophila tupanensis Lane, 1961 c g
 Mycetophila uacupisi Lane, 1958 c g
 Mycetophila uaianai Lane, 1952 c g
 Mycetophila uaicensis Lane, 1955 c g
 Mycetophila uboyasi Lane, 1955 c g
 Mycetophila uliginosa Chandler, 1988 c g
 Mycetophila unca Zaitzev, 1999 c g
 Mycetophila uncinata (Laffoon, 1957) i c g
 Mycetophila uncta Plassmann, 1999 c g
 Mycetophila unguiculata Lundstrom, 1913 c g
 Mycetophila unicolor Stannius, 1831 c g
 Mycetophila unicornuta Freeman, 1951 c g
 Mycetophila uninotata Zetterstedt, 1852 c g
 Mycetophila unipunctata Meigen, 1818 i c g b
 Mycetophila uniseries Freeman, 1951 c g
 Mycetophila unispinosa Tonnoir & Edwards, 1927 c g
 Mycetophila variable Duret, 1986 c g
 Mycetophila vaurasi Lane, 1958 c g
 Mycetophila vegeta (Laffoon, 1957) i c g
 Mycetophila veligera Freeman, 1951 c g
 Mycetophila venusta (Laffoon, 1957) i c g
 Mycetophila verberifera Freeman, 1951 c g
 Mycetophila verecunda (Laffoon, 1957) i c g
 Mycetophila vesca (Laffoon, 1957) i c g
 Mycetophila vianai Duret, 1981 c g
 Mycetophila victoriaensis Duret, 1983 c g
 Mycetophila vigena Wu, He & Yang, 1998 c g
 Mycetophila virgata Tonnoir & Edwards, 1927 c g
 Mycetophila viridipes Freeman, 1951 c g
 Mycetophila viridis Tonnoir & Edwards, 1927 c g
 Mycetophila viticollis Blanchard, 1852 c g
 Mycetophila vitipennis Freeman, 1951 c g
 Mycetophila vittipes Zetterstedt, 1852 c g
 Mycetophila vivida Plassmann & Schacht, 1999 c g
 Mycetophila v-nigrum Lundstrom, 1913 c g
 Mycetophila volitans Lynch Arribalzaga, 1892 c g
 Mycetophila vulgaris Tonnoir & Edwards, 1927 c g
 Mycetophila willineri Duret, 1981 c g
 Mycetophila willinki Duret, 1981 c g
 Mycetophila winnertzi Lane, 1948 c g
 Mycetophila wirthi (Laffoon, 1957) i c g
 Mycetophila wygodzinskyi Lane, 1947 c g
 Mycetophila xamasensis Lane, 1955 c g
 Mycetophila xanthopyga Winnertz, 1863 c g
 Mycetophila xanthotricha Mik, 1884 c g
 Mycetophila yaganesi Duret, 1980 c g
 Mycetophila yamanasi Duret, 1986 c g
 Mycetophila yivoffi Duret, 1981 c g
 Mycetophila yuriamuesi Lane, 1955 c g
 Mycetophila zetterstedtii Lundstrom, 1906 c g
 Mycetophila ziegleri Kurina, 2008 c g

Data sources: i = ITIS, c = Catalogue of Life, g = GBIF, b = Bugguide.net

References

Mycetophila